The California Department of Toxic Substances Control (or DTSC) is an agency of the government of the state of California.  The mission of the DTSC is to protect public health and the environment from toxic harm.  DTSC is part of the California Environmental Protection Agency (Cal/EPA), has more than one thousand employees, and is headquartered in Sacramento.  DTSC also has a number of regional offices across the state including two environmental chemistry laboratories, and field offices in Sacramento, Berkeley, Los Angeles, Chatsworth, Commerce, Cypress, Clovis (Fresno), San Diego and Calexico.

History 

The Hazardous Waste Control Act of 1972 established legal standards for hazardous waste. Accordingly, in 1972, the Department of Health Services created the new Hazardous Waste Management Unit, staffing it in 1973 with five employees concerned primarily with developing regulations and setting fees for the disposal of hazardous waste. In 1978, the Love Canal disaster caused an upswing in funding for the unit, which grew quickly to nearly seventy people before being made an official branch of the department.

In 1981, the Unit was converted into the Toxic Substances Control Division, consisting of a laboratory in Berkeley and a headquarters office in Sacramento, and took on public information duties. Eventually, the Division was severed from the Department of Health Services and placed under the new California Environmental Protection Agency.

Areas of responsibility 

DTSC regulates the generation, handling, treatment and disposal of hazardous waste in California.  DTSC also cleans up thousands of hazardous waste sites in California including disposal sites and industrial sites that resulted in contamination of soil and groundwater.

Programs and laws
In close cooperation with the United States Environmental Protection Agency, DTSC administers both state and federal hazardous waste programs including: 
California Environmental Quality Act—CEQA;
Resource Conservation and Recovery Act—RCRA
Comprehensive Environmental Response, Compensation, and Liability Act—CERCLA
Toxic Substances Control Act—TSCA - of 1976. 
and a number of other State and Federal bodies of law dealing with hazardous materials and the environment.

Scope
Over the years the scope of activity of the agency has expanded significantly to include the regulation of commercial products including toys, jewelry and even food packaging as it pertains to toxic substances contained within them and the exposure of humans and the environment to these toxic substances.

DTSC protects the public health of communities and the environment from toxic contamination left behind from past industrial and commercial activities through its brownfields and environmental remediation programs under RCRA (Resources Conservation and Recovery Act), CERCLA/Superfund, as well as 8 or 9 other laws governing clean up of contaminated land, water and air.

DTSC protects the public health of communities and the environment from toxic substances in current economic use and hazardous waste being generated by present-day industrial and commercial activities through its permitting and regulatory programs to ensure the safe handling, transport, storage and disposal of toxic substances and waste.

DTSC protects future generations from the long term stewardship of hazardous substances through pollution prevention business assistance programs, and its new green chemistry mandate - to reduce use of toxic substances in everyday products used by California consumers.

Office of Criminal Investigations 
Within DTSC's Hazardous Waste Management Program is the Office of Criminal Investigations (or OCI).

OCI is staffed with:

 Criminal Investigators (Sworn California State Peace Officers)
 Environmental Scientists 
 Computer Forensics Specialists

DTSC Investigators are duly sworn peace officers of the State of California. They are authorized to conduct investigations, make arrests, and carry firearms (among other duties).

Investigators must also satisfactorily complete a Regular Basic Police Academy course and ongoing POST mandated perishable skills training.

Green Chemistry Initiative 

DTSC is responsible for implementing California's Green Chemistry Initiative.  The Initiative consists of a number of laws seeking to create in California a regulatory market driven environment under which all products will be carefully evaluated so that they are in harmony with public health and the environment.  For that purpose, DTSC has created a Green Chemistry Wiki seeking to write regulations pursuant to the Green Chemistry Initiative in real time cooperation with California stakeholders, chemical industry representatives, the people of the State of California and the World.

Exide lead contamination
In 2015, Exide lead contamination raised concerns about longstanding problems at the state Department of Toxic Substances Control. The governor and state legislators sought new laws, oversight hearings, and other reform efforts after a battery recycling facility east of Los Angeles was allowed to operate without a full permit for more than three decades and the company was not required to set aside adequate funds to clean up pollution coming from the plant.

References

External links

Official State of California Department of Toxic Substances Control—DTSC website
The California Green Chemistry Wiki
DTSC Office of Criminal Investigations website

DTSC
Environment of California
Toxic Substances Control
Waste organizations